Stefan Kramer Solé (born 19 February 1982) is a Chilean impressionist, actor, comedian and announcer. He is known in Chile for his ability to mimic accents, gestures and expressions of dozens of famous people in Chile, such as TV hosts, singers, politicians, sports players, sportscasters, and celebrities.

Biography 
Kramer comes from a German Swiss family in the Araucanía Region of southern Chile. He is married to singer Paloma Soto. 

Kramer's first television appearance was as a contestant on ¿Cuánto vale el show? on Chilevisión. His debut as an impressionist was in the TVN television show Noche de Juegos, during the comedy section of Ponce Candidato, a character performed by Julián Elfenbein.

Kramer has participated in various television shows, such as Mekano (Mega), Amenaza Real (Canal 13) (performing Polimorphicuz, a man who suffers from multiple personality disorder), De Pe a Pá (TVN), REC and ¿Cuánto vale el show?, both programs from Chilevisión and hosted by Leo Caprile. In 2006 Kramer had a great success in the Huaso de Olmué Festival.

Kramer took part successfully in the second night of the Viña de Mar Festival in 2008. In a comedy routine that lasted almost 90 minutes, Kramer impersonated around 33 characters. The audience acclaimed and awarded him with two Antorchas (Oro and Plata – English: Gold and Silver Torchs) and a Gaviota de Plata (English: Silver Seagull). Many Chilean TV shows have taken advantage of the good rating that produces Kramer's routine and they have repeated it in uncountable occasions, without the comedian receives some money remuneration.

On 12 July 2009, Kramer appeared on TVN's Animal Nocturno, where he personified several presidential candidates, such as Marco Enríquez-Ominami, Eduardo Frei Ruiz-Tagle, and Sebastián Piñera. He also imitated football manager Marcelo Bielsa, which was met with praise.

In 2010, Kramer co-hosted with Felipe Camiroaga the TV show Halcón y Camaleón in TVN, where he achieved great success. During one of the shows, Kramer personified Bielsa, where he explained the alleged reasons for the impasse that he lived in La Moneda with the Chilean President Sebastián Piñera. Kramer previously taped a personification of Piñera, which caused displeasure within the Chilean Government, as it was held just when the former President Michelle Bachelet was invited.

On 2 December 2011, Kramer was again invited to the Telethon Theater, as the opening artist for that year's Teletón, where he imitated Miguel "Negro" Piñera, the brother of President Sebastián Piñera. For the 30th Anniversary of the Chilean Telethon, he performed at the closing ceremony at the National Stadium, where he imitated politicians and Teletón host Mario Kreutzberger (Don Francisco), of "Sábado Gigante" fame. Kramer was praised by Don Francisco himself. He repeated at the closures of the 2014, 2015, and 2016 editions.

On 26 May 2016, Kramer became the announcer of his own television show, called Kamaleón, el show de Kramer, and broadcast by TVN. Also, he was invited by Chilevisión in the new version of the El Club de la Comedia stand-up comedy show.

Filmography

List of personified characters

References

External links 
 

1982 births
Living people
People from Santiago
Chilean male television actors
Chilean male film actors
Chilean impressionists (entertainers)
Chilean people of Swiss-German descent
Chilean male comedians
Chilean stand-up comedians